Karen W. Pane is the former Assistant Secretary for Policy and Planning at the Department of Veterans Affairs. Prior to her last position she served as the Director of the Office of Performance Monitoring, Center for Program Planning and Results at the United States Department of Labor.

Early life
Pane is a native Floridian and she attended the University of Florida for her bachelor's degree in Nursing.  She also attended the University of San Francisco and received a master's degree in Public Affairs. Additionally, Pane also served in the United States Navy Reserve Nurse Corps.

References

External links
Assistant Secretary Karen W. Pane
Additional info about Karen Pane

Living people
University of Florida alumni
United States Department of Veterans Affairs officials
Year of birth missing (living people)